Caodeyao (in reference to the village of Caodeyao) is a genus of therocephalian that lived in what is now China during the late Permian. It was found in the Naobaogou Formation. It contains one species, Caodeyao liuyufengi, named in 2020 by Jun Liu and Fernando Abdala.

References

Eutherocephalians
Therocephalia genera
Lopingian synapsids of Asia
Fossil taxa described in 2020